Bernard Challandes (born 26 July 1951) is a Swiss professional football coach and former player who last managed Kosovo.

Coaching career

Clubs

Challandes became coach of Saint-Imier in 1978. Subsequently, he has been the coach of many other teams in the Swiss championship as Le Locle, La Chaux-de-Fonds, Yverdon Sports, Young Boys, Servette, Zürich, Sion, Neuchâtel Xamax and Thun. Challandes was most successful during the time he was coach of Zürich, when it became champions of the 2008–09 season, and with Sion when they won the Swiss Cup in the 2010–11 season. Since 2015, he has been the scout with Basel.

National teams

Armenia
On 28 February 2014, the Armenia national football team appointed Challandes as their manager with a two-year contract to lead the team during UEFA Euro 2016 qualifying after the former coach Vardan Minasyan decided in October 2013 not to sign a new deal with the Football Federation of Armenia, despite having an encouraging UEFA Euro 2012 qualifying and 2014 FIFA World Cup qualification campaigns. In May 2014. Challandes made his first squad announcement with Armenia for the friendly matches against United Arab Emirates and Algeria. He brought four new players into the squad: Aleksandr Tumasyan, Alex, Mauro Guevgeozián and Rumyan Hovsepyan. On 27 May 2014, Challandes had his first official match as Armenia manager in a 4–3 home win against United Arab Emirates. On 30 March 2015, Challandes resigned after Armenia failed to qualify for the UEFA Euro 2016.

Kosovo

On 2 March 2018, Kosovo appointed Challandes to a two-year contract after the former coach Albert Bunjaki decided to resign, after weak results, in October 2017. On 19 March 2018, Challandes made his first Kosovo squad announcement for the friendly matches against Madagascar and Burkina Faso, bringing in three new players: Edon Zhegrova, Gjelbrim Taipi and Idriz Voca. On 24 March 2018, Challandes had his first match as Kosovo manager in a 1–0 home win against Madagascar.

Under him, Kosovo won all three of friendly matches. On September 2018, the UEFA Nations League began. In the 3rd group of league D, Kosovo was in the group with Azerbaijan, Malta and Faroe Islands. Kosovo finished first in the group, giving it a chance to qualify for UEFA Euro 2020, through the knockout phase, in March 2020.

Honours

Manager
Zurich
 2008–09 Swiss Super League

Sion
 2010–11 Swiss Cup

Managerial record

References

External links
Bernard Challandes at Soccerway
 Bernard Challandes Interview

1951 births
Living people
Swiss people of Italian descent
Swiss men's footballers
Urania Genève Sport players
Swiss football managers
Swiss expatriate football managers
FC La Chaux-de-Fonds managers
Yverdon-Sport FC managers
BSC Young Boys managers
Servette FC managers
FC Zürich managers
FC Sion managers
Neuchâtel Xamax FCS managers
FC Thun managers
Armenia national football team managers
Kosovo national football team managers
Association football defenders
Swiss Challenge League managers
Swiss Super League managers
Expatriate football managers in Kosovo